The 2022 World Athletics Continental Tour, also known as the 2022 Continental Tour, is the third season of the annual series of outdoor track and field meetings, organised by World Athletics. The Tour forms the second tier of international one-day meetings after the Diamond League.

The Continental Tour is divided into three levels – Gold, Silver and Bronze – whose status is determined by the quality of competition and prize money on offer.

Schedule

Gold level

Silver level

Bronze level

References

External links

2022
World Athletics Continental Tour